("pasta to the oven", i.e.

History 
Baked pasta can ideally be divided in two big categories: the version with béchamel was born in the Renaissance courts of the Center and North, as a poorer variant of meat pies, from which probably derive very famous dishes such as baked lasagna and Emilian cannelloni; the so-called  or pasta 'ncasciata is instead one of the most typical dishes of Sicily (particularly of the province of Messina, in the specific of Mistretta, and of the province of Catania) and has its origins in very ancient traditions, essentially ascribable to the sumptuous timbales that Arabs introduced in Sicily during their domination dating back to the ninth century, to which, however, is due the name timballo itself.

Preparation 

For the preparation of this dish various types of short and medium cut pasta, such as rigatoni, penne, tortiglioni, ziti and maccheroni are used. If the traditional preparation of Messina imposes the use of the typical maccheroncini, the tradition of Palermo requires the use of the typical format of anelletti which give the dish an appearance similar to a flan or timballo. The pasta, cooked very al dente, (it will finish cooking in the oven), drained and well mixed with the sauce, is then distributed in layers in a slightly greased baking pan or dish (or on which has been distributed a very thin layer of sauce) and alternated with ingredients linked to local traditions. In order to obtain a good quality result, it is necessary to prepare a good sauce, more or less elaborated, but with simple steps and with good quality ingredients; also in this case there are many variations according to local traditions, but generally it is made of minced beef and/or pork, after having been sautéed together with a finely chopped onion, flavored with aromatic herbs, salt and pepper and sprinkled with good red wine, tomato sauce is added and simmered for half an hour in order to allow the sauce to acquire flavor and taste.

The composition of the layers is essentially based on the classic filling of cheeses such as provola or caciocavallo cheese, sliced (mostly) cooked ham also in cubes, salami, or more frequently the typical Calabrian schiacciata or soppressata), hard-boiled eggs cut into slices or wedges and the inevitable fried meatballs.

The Sicilian version, (pasta ncasciata) among its ingredients, also includes eggplants, usually cut in thin slices and fried or cubed.

However, pasta can be prepared in many different ways, and there are many versions – quite common – based on white sauces with onion and minced meat or bechamel sauce, which is usually used to enhance the filling of vegetables such as artichokes or radicchio.

See also 
 Al forno
 Anelletti al forno
 Lasagne
 Pastitsio

References

Bibliography

Other projects 

  Wikiquote contiene citazioni di o su pasta al forno
  Wikimedia Commons contiene immagini o altri file su pasta al forno
Cuisine of Sicily
Pasta dishes
Italian cuisine
Baked foods